Martin Marinov (born 25 October 1967) is a Bulgarian-born Australian flatwater canoeist who competed from the late 1980s and the mid-2000s (decade). A former "Mr Bulgaria" he won two Olympic medals for that country in the Canadian canoeing 500 m events.
Married for Darina Marinova from 07.05.1989.
Kids: Georgi Marinov 08.05.1992 and Maria-Veronika Marinova 14.04.1997.
Grandkids: Martin Marinov 27.01.2020

Biography
In Seoul in 1988 he was the bronze medalist in the C-1 500 m. Four years later in Barcelona he and teammate Blagovest Stoyanov won bronze in the C-2 500 m. At the 1996 Summer Olympics, Marinov and Stojanov reached both C-2 finals, finishing fourth in the 1000 m and fifth in the 500 m events, respectively.

Marinov later emigrated and represented Australia. He retired after the 2004 Summer Olympics where he was eliminated in the C-1 500 m semi-final.

He also won five ICF Canoe Sprint World Championships medals with a silver (C-1 1000 m: 1987) and four bronzes (C-1 500 m: 1989, 1990; C-2 200 m: 1995, C-2 500 m: 1994).

During October 2006 and December 2012, Marinov was appointed as Head Coach of the AIS Canoe/Kayak Program.

During 2013–2017 he was a head coach of the Chinese Canoe-kayak National Team and Anhoi Canoe-kayak team.

Marinov participated at 2016 Rio Olympics as the oldest ever Olympian in canoe-kayak disciplines at age of 48 and finished 10th place in C2 1000m and 14th place in C1 1000m.

From 08.2017 Martin Marinov is a Technical Director for flatwater disciplines at the International Canoe Federation (ICF)

References

1967 births
Australian male canoeists
Bulgarian male canoeists
Bulgarian emigrants to Australia
Canoeists at the 1988 Summer Olympics
Canoeists at the 1992 Summer Olympics
Canoeists at the 1996 Summer Olympics
Canoeists at the 2004 Summer Olympics
Canoeists at the 2016 Summer Olympics
Living people
Olympic canoeists of Australia
Olympic canoeists of Bulgaria
Olympic bronze medalists for Bulgaria
Olympic medalists in canoeing
ICF Canoe Sprint World Championships medalists in Canadian
Medalists at the 1992 Summer Olympics
Medalists at the 1988 Summer Olympics